This is a list of episodes of The Kabocha Wine, a 95-episode anime television series based on an award-winning manga series by Mitsuru Miura. The series was produced by Toei Animation and aired on TV Asahi from 5 July 1982 through 27 August 1984.

Series summary

Theme music 

Lists of anime episodes